Cirriemblemaria lucasana, the plume blenny, is a species of pikeblenny found in coral reefs in the Gulf of California.  This species feeds primarily on zooplankton. It and can reach a maximum length of  TL.

References
 Stephens, J. S. Jr. 1963 (31 Dec.) A revised classification of the blennioid fishes of the American family Chaenopsidae. University of California Publications in Zoology v. 68: 1–165, Pls. 1-15.

Chaenopsidae
Fish described in 1963
Monotypic fish genera